Carry On Jatta is a 2012 Indian Punjabi comedy film directed by Smeep Kang and starring Gippy Grewal, and Mahie Gill. The film released on 27 July 2012. This movie was remade in Odia in 2015 as Pilata Bigidigala, in Telugu in 2016 as Eedo Rakam Aado Rakam, in Bangladesh (Bengali) in 2017 as Dhat Teri Ki and in Bengali (India) in 2019 as Jamai Badal. The core storyline was loosely based on the 1989 Malayalam movie Chakkikotha Chankaran.

Plot
Jass (Gippy Grewal) falls in love with Mahie (Mahie Gill) at a friend's wedding, she tells her friends that she is going to marry someone who does not have a family, like herself. Mahi does not want to deal with the nagging, and interference of in-laws after marriage. So, to woo her, Jass with the help of his friend Honey (Gurpreet Ghuggi) pretends that he is an orphan. She falls in love with him, but when she tells her brother, Taji (Karamjit Anmol) he forces them to get married right away. So, Jass marries Mahie without telling his father Advocate Dhillon (Jaswinder Bhalla), brother Goldy Dhillon (Binnu Dhillon), or his wife Diljit Dhillon (Anshu Sawhney). Now, after marriage, Jass tells Mahie to find them a place to stay, and she finds a sublease room in Jass's own home, and that is where the comedy of errors begins. Jass and his best friend Honey (Gurpreet Ghuggi) cook up several plans to confuse Jass's family so Jass can live with his wife Mahie in his own home without his family ever finding out. But in between all this, Honey marries his girlfriend Preet (Khushboo Grewal) in secret because his dad Inspector Sikander Tiwana (B.N. Sharma) won't agree to his marriage, but Honey tricks Preet's parents and Preet into believing that he is Advocate Dhillon's son. This leads to a big time fiasco. Everything unravels at the end and Mahi accepts Jass for who he is.

Cast
 Gippy Grewal as Jass Dhillon
 Mahie Gill as Mahie 
 Gurpreet Ghuggi as Honey Tiwana
 Binnu Dhillon as Goldy Dhillon
 Anshu Sawhney as Daljeet Dhillon
 Jaswinder Bhalla as Advocate Dhillon
 Khushboo Grewal as Preet Bhullar
 Sardar Sohi as Vada Bhullar
 B.N. Sharma as Sikander Singh Tiwana
 Rana Ranbir as Chota Bhullar/Aarhu
 Karamjit Anmol as Taji
 Inderjit Nikku [cameo]
 Lakki Harkhowalia as Veer
 Harby Sangha

Production
This is Gippy Grewal's home production where he launched his banner Gurfateh Films along with his brothers Sippy Grewal who launched his banner Sippy Grewal Productions, sukha production and Pushpinder Happy. The entire shoot of the film took place in Jalandhar, Punjab.

Box office

Carry On Jatta had the second-highest opening for a Punjabi film in Punjab with Rs. 61 lakh net on its opening day; this is Rs. 1 lakh more than Gippy Grewal's last movie Mirza, which was the biggest opener at that time. It then went on to have a weekend collection of Rs 2.05 Cr, an opening week collection of Rs 3.75 Cr and is on its way to make a total of Rs 10 Crore in India, making it the second-highest grossing Punjabi film in India.

Soundtrack

Track listing

Awards

Carry On Jatta won eight awards at the 3rd PTC Punjabi Film Awards in 2013.

Sequel
Carry on Jatta 2 a sequel with Gippy Grewal and Sonam Bajwa in lead roles and Gurpreet Ghuggi, Binnu Dhillon, Jaswinder Bhalla, B.N. Sharma, Karamjit Anmol, Upasana Singh and Jyotii Sethi in supporting roles was released on 1 June 2018.

References

External links
 

2012 films
2010s Hindi-language films
2012 romantic comedy films
Indian romantic comedy films
Films scored by Jatinder Shah
Punjabi films remade in other languages
Punjabi remakes of Malayalam films
Punjabi-language Indian films
2010s Punjabi-language films